Mormando is a surname. Notable people with the surname include:

 Franco Mormando (born 1955), Italian historian, university professor, and author
 Giovanni Francesco Mormando (1449–1530), Italian architect 
 Nicholas Mormando (1944–1985), American mobster
 Robert Mormando, American mobster
 Steve Mormando (born 1955), American fencer

Italian-language surnames